Club Deportes Castro is a Chilean professional basketball team located in Castro, Chile. The team currently competes in the Liga Nacional de Básquetbol de Chile.

History
Deportes Castro was established in 2003. The team's first coach was Jose Fernandez, who led the team until 2010. The most notable performance were at the Liga Nacional 2011-2012, when they won the title.

Trophies
 Liga Nacional: 1
2011-12
 Liga Saesa/Libsur: 1
2010

Notable players 
To appear in this section a player must have either:
 Set a club record or won an individual award as a professional player.
 Played at least one official international match for his senior national team or one NBA game at any time.
 Ignacio Arroyo
 Samuel Bravo
 Juan Fontena
 Zaronn Cann
 Spencer Smith
 Brandon Cole

References

External links
Presentation at Latinbasket.com
Presentation on Facebook

Basketball teams in Chile
Basketball teams established in 2003
Castro, Chile
Sport in Los Lagos Region
2003 establishments in Chile